Theta Phi Alpha, commonly known as Theta Phi, is a women's fraternity founded at the University of Michigan – Ann Arbor on August 30, 1912. Theta Phi Alpha is one of 26 national sororities recognized in the National Panhellenic Conference. Today, Theta Phi Alpha has 55 active chapters across the United States. Theta Phi has alumnae clubs and associations in almost every major city. The organization is involved in the philanthropies Glenmary Home Missioners and The House that Theta Phi Alpha Built which help the homeless and underprivileged, specifically in the Appalachian Mountain region, and Camp Friendship, a summer camp in northeast Mississippi for children from disadvantaged and low-income homes.

Theta Phi Alpha was born out of the demise of a local Catholic sorority, Omega Upsilon. Father Edward D. Kelly contacted Amelia McSweeney to discuss the possibility of a new organization. Amelia and nine other founding sisters, active collegiate members and alumnae of Omega Upsilon, banded together to organize Theta Phi Alpha throughout the summer of 1912. Theta Phi Alpha continued to grow, especially after the merger with another Catholic social women's fraternity, Pi Lambda Sigma, in 1952. Although Theta Phi Alpha began as a sorority for Catholic women, the organization opened its doors to all women in 1968.

History

Founding 
Father Edward D. Kelly (later bishop), a pastor of the student chapel at the University of Michigan saw a need for Catholic women to have a place to go for socialization and friendship. From this need, he started the women's fraternity Omega Upsilon in 1909 for Catholic women.  Several women students were originally very interested in joining, partly because Catholics were not always welcome in the other Greek-letter sororities on campus. By founding this new Greek letter organization, Catholic women had fraternity life opened to them.

By the spring of 1912, Omega Upsilon was failing financially and membership was low. Father Kelly requested the assistance of Amelia McSweeney, who graduated from the university in 1898. Amelia and other alumnae of Omega Upsilon began actively to redesign the failing organization. Throughout the summer of 1912, the ten founders prepared for the new organization. Plans for the coming school year were completed on August 30, 1912, and Theta Phi Alpha began operation on the campus of the University of Michigan.

During the first week, Theta Phi Alpha received its first new member, Kathlyn Holmes. The first initiation of Theta Phi Alpha was held on November 16, 1912, for the new sisters Kathlyn Holmes and Marie Sullivan.

1950s 

Theta Phi Alpha joined the NPC in 1951 along with ten other national sororities in the NPC's most recent expansion.

On June 28, 1952, Theta Phi Alpha absorbed Pi Lambda Sigma, the only other national Catholic women's fraternity. Pi Lambda Sigma at the time of the merger had four chapters that joined Theta Phi Alpha: their chapters at Boston University and University of Cincinnati merged with the Theta Phi Alpha chapters present there; the chapter at Creighton University became Chi chapter of Theta Phi Alpha; and the one at Quincy College became Psi chapter. The fraternity initiated the national president of Pi Lambda Sigma at the 1952 convention and welcomed all Pi Lambda Sigma sisters to become Theta Phi Alpha sisters.

1970s–1980s 
In 1969, Theta Phi Alpha hit a chapter count of 18 with the loss of Rho at Penn State. At the National Convention in 1972, Theta Phi Alpha began considering expansion to Junior and two-year colleges. Two years after this consideration, only ten chapters (Epsilon, Kappa, Sigma, Upsilon, Chi, Alpha Gamma, Alpha Epsilon, Alpha Iota, and newly installed Alpha Mu (Northern Kentucky University) and Alpha Nu (General Motors Institute)) were represented at the convention. This chapter count was well below the required number for membership in NPC. At the following convention in 1976, the Fraternity began discussing options of dissolution, merger, or commitment to growth.

The chapter count began to grow over the next four years with the reinstatement of three chapters (Alpha Beta, Alpha Xi, Alpha Zeta), until in 1981 NPC notified Theta Phi Alpha they were placed in Associate Member Status due to low chapter count. The Fraternity had until 1987 to obtain 14 active chapters, the youngest had to be two years active. Due to its associate status and financial strain, Theta Phi Alpha gave up its spot as NPC treasurer in rotation for NPC Chairmanship. This also hindered the organization from acting as Vice Chairman for the following two years, and finally Chairman. Despite this setback, Theta Phi Alpha was committed to expansion. Over the following six years, the fraternity gained eleven chapters and was granted full membership status in NPC in 1987.

1990s 
Looking into the new millennium, the conversation on a national level turned to the role of religion in ritual. In 1968, Theta Phi opened its doors to women of all faith and replaced the crucifix used in rituals with a cross. In 1988, there was a discussion of removing the cross in ritual. The discussion was tabled during the convention but it was decided that the cross would have a less prominent role in ritual In 1990, Theta Phi Alpha surveyed the sisters about the Catholic influences in the ritual. The most positive response was to adjust the ritual to match the current views of the national fraternity, while the most negative response was to remove all references to God in the ritual. This dissonance between the sisters is still discussed today. However, Theta Phi Alpha has slowly removed religious aspects, in 1990 the Lord's Prayer was removed from the ritual. In 1992, the Theta Phi Alpha Prayer was removedand the following year a less religious ritual for deceased members and a nonreligious national philanthropy, The House that Theta Phi Alpha Built was introduced.

Other efforts were made to create a new national identity during this time. In 2003, the logo and tagline were developed. At this time, the fraternity was also looking to honor its history as a singing fraternity. In 2010, a national songbook was developed and a CD with the songs called Everlasting Melodies were given out as grab bag gifts at the National Convention.

During this time there was also an interest to strengthen existing chapters, now that the fraternity was in good standings with NPC. The fraternity began to develop programs to increase the leadership abilities of each chapter. These efforts included instating the leadership conference in 1991 as well as developing standards for sisters as well as new members. The standards for new members were focused on new member education through the development of a program called My Sister, My Friend. The fraternity also created Leadership Consultants to advise chapters throughout the country. The fraternity also began to look at risk management concerning hazing and alcohol abuse in 1987. In 1993, a national risk management and chapter operation manual was created.

In 1998, the majority of chapters fell below the minimum chapter size, were in violation of hazing or alcohol policies, or did not meet financial obligations. This sparked the establishment of many programs such as Compass Point and Reflections to help chapters grow and look at chapter life. The National Office also began to improve communication through the development of a national website. In 2003, a fine was instated for chapters with membership numbers under the campus total number of girls possible to recruit for its campus. This controversial fine was created to keep chapters active in recruitment. The following year a GPA minimum and value-based recruitment system were put in place as a way to strengthen chapter membership. Theta Phi Alpha approved the expansion of its Grand Council from five to seven members in 2006 to have more of a focus on chapter assistance.

Founders 

The founders of Theta Phi Alpha are eight alumnae of the university and two undergraduates. These women collectively selected the fraternity's flower, jewels, and colors.

Dorothy Phalan (then Caughey) 
Dorothy assisted in the founding of the sorority by providing the original meeting space to plan the reorganization of Omega Upsilon. Her daughter, Margaret, became the first legacy of Theta Phi Alpha to pledge.

Katrina Ward (then Caughey) 
After graduating from the University of Michigan in 1911 with a literary degree. Katrina assisted the new Theta Phi Alpha as an Omega Upsilon alumnae. Alongside her sister, Dorothy, she supported the original meetings of Theta Phi Alpha. She believed that experience through adversity strengthened fraternal bonds.

Mildred Connely 
Mildred's focus was on turning Theta Phi Alpha into a national sorority by visiting old Omega Upsilon members. Mildred became the second President, the first Chairman of the Board of Trustees, the first recipient of the Guard of Honor, the primary writer of the creed, and earned the distinction of the "Lifetime Keeper of the Ritual."

Selma Gilday 
Selma was born on August 21, 1877, in Monroe, Michigan. She attended the University of Michigan and graduated with a degree in Latin and German in 1902. Selma was present at the first tea for Theta Phi Alpha and focused on securing alumnae support for the new organization. After founding Theta Phi Alpha, Selma went on to teach German, Latin, and mathematics for 46 years in Toledo where she organized the Toledo-Monroe City Alumnae Association until she died on June 10, 1958.

Otilia O'Hara (then Leuchtweis) 
Otilia, one of the only undergraduate founders, was the first to sign the record book and become president of the Alpha chapter in 1912. She, along with Eva, located and secured the home for the newest sisters of Theta Phi Alpha. She also managed the first recruitment effort which brought in ten active members. After she graduated the following year, Otilia remained involved in the fraternity and chaired the committee that selected the gift of silver flatware presented to Alpha at the 1941 National Convention.

Amelia McSweeney 
After graduating from the University of Michigan in 1898 as an alumna of Omega Upsilon, Amelia became an important figure in education and civic life in Detroit. This experience in civic life and education was the reason Father Edward A. Kelly approached her to found this new Catholic sorority. Amelia believed strongly in the early need for Panhellenic recognition on campus. On December 12, 1913, on one of Amelia's trips for the sorority, Amelia contracted meningitis that ultimately ended her life, and she succumbed on January 4, 1914.

Camilla Sutherland (then Ryan) 
Camilla was an alumna teacher of Omega Upsilon when she was approached by Bishop Edward Kelly to establish the sorority. Camilla believed that in order for the organization to survive, participants could not separate undergraduate and graduate members. She utilized this belief when setting up the national structure, which is today almost entirely run by alumnae. Camilla, along with her sister, hosted a joint meeting of the Grand Council and the Board of Trustees in 1931 in her family home.

Helen Quinlan (then Ryan) 
Helen graduated from the University of Michigan in 1908 and started teaching mathematics in Detroit. Helen was a prominent Catholic woman in the Cleveland area where she formed the first National Council of Catholic Women. She contributed her Catholic influence and charitable work to the new Theta Phi Alpha fraternity.

May C. Ryan 
As a founding member, May is credited with developing the name, motto, and original coat of arms for Theta Phi Alpha. She was also a member of the Board of Trustees until she died on May 18, 1935.

Eva Bauer Everson (then Stroh) 
Eva Regina Stroh, the other collegiate founder, acquired the furnishings and housing for the original Theta Phi Alpha house in the summer of 1912 as a freshman, along with Otilia Leuchtweis. Before she entered the University, Eva found solace in the St. Catherine of Siena Catholic Church, whose namesake became the patroness of the Theta Phi Alpha fraternity. Showing her involvement in Theta Phi Alpha, she named the fraternity as a beneficiary in her will.

Symbols 
Theta Phi Alpha's official colors are blue, gold, and silver. Blue represents the bond between sisters, while silver and gold represent endless faith. The fraternity's jewels are sapphire for loyalty and the pearl. The fraternity's symbol, a compass, represents direction. Its flower is a white rose, while its mascot is a penguin.

The coat of arms is an azure crest with a diagonal band between a cross with two beams on each arm and top, bearing a Tudor rose with black seeds and gold. The bottom beam is pointed and longer than the others, while a cloak-like blue and gold arch covers the top. Over the esquire's helmet, the crest has an open book with a silver and gold edge. This book is imprinted with two blue fleur-de-lis. The motto, Theta Phi Alpha in Greek lettering, is written in upper and lower case on the blue banner on the bottom of the crest.

Badges 
The new member pin is a square badge in black enamel with a gold compass in the center, and a gold border.

The fraternity badge is a gold letter "Theta" set with pearls, superimposed upon plain gold letters "Phi" and "Alpha." The badge of Theta Phi Alpha is worn only by initiated members and is at once a means of identification and a source of pride to the wearer. The fraternity badge is to be worn over the heart and is always placed above any other piece of jewelry. The badge is to be worn with 'badge attire' which is similar to business attire. Upon the death of a member, her badge is either sent to the fraternity's archives or buried with her. Each member has the responsibility to see that her family knows of these alternatives, and should arrange to have one or the other followed at her death.

The national president's badge, worn by the national president during her term in office, is similar to the official badge but with the Theta set with diamonds, mounted on a wreath of gold. The chapter president's badge is purchased by a chapter and worn by its president during her term. Similar to the national president's badge, but with the Theta set with sapphires. The Grand Council badge, worn by each member of the Grand Council (other than the national president), is the official badge set with alternating diamonds and sapphires and a diamond in the center, mounted on a wreath of gold, and is worn accompanied by a guard. Guards are worn by current and former members of the Grand Council and exemplify the fraternity's coat of arms set with a sapphire on each side.

Motto 
Theta Phi Alpha recognizes Saint Catherine of Siena as its patroness. Her motto, "nothing great is ever achieved without much enduring," is the fraternity's official motto. The Siena Medal is the highest award given to a non-member of Theta Phi Alpha by the fraternity. Because of the deep respect and reverence for Saint Catherine, her feast day, April 30, is used to celebrate the fraternity's founding because the original date, August 30, frequently does not fall within the academic year at most universities.

Philanthropy

Foundation 
The Theta Phi Alpha Foundation oversees the organization's philanthropic causes. The foundation provides resources for Theta Phi Alpha for scholarships, philanthropy, community service, and education through charitable giving. The vision of the Theta Phi Alpha Foundation is stated as one of "ever loyal commitment, everlasting support." While the Theta Phi Alpha Foundation oversees national philanthropic causes, each chapter may also support additional philanthropic causes.

Glenmary Home Missioners 
Theta Phi Alpha nationally adopted Glenmary Home Missioners as its philanthropy in 1959. Glenmary's work is in depressed, rural areas of the United States, primarily in the Appalachian Mountains, where they distribute food, clothing, and books to needy persons, and assist in providing medical care, job training, and tutoring. The partnership began when the sisters assisted in building a seminary for the missioners.

Camp Friendship 
Over the summer, Glenmary hosts a summer camp in Mississippi for underprivileged youth called Camp Friendship/ Camp Glenmary. Theta Phi Alpha sponsors the camp and donates clothing, toiletries, and arts and crafts supplies. Sisters may also volunteer for two weeks to help run the camp, offsetting costs that allow participation by children who otherwise may not be able to afford the program.

The House That Theta Phi Alpha Built 
The House That Theta Phi Alpha Built is Theta Phi Alpha's newest philanthropic cause, established in 1993. The common goal of "The House" is to improve the plight of the homeless in any way. Chapters may seek to assist organizations that help the homeless, shelters, home building, or neighborhood revitalization projects. This goal permits all Theta Phi Alphas to help those in need in their community while remaining united in aim and purpose. The umbrella term allows sisters to identify the issues in their communities. Many specific charitable efforts fall under The House That Theta Phi Alpha built, such as promoting literacy, serving dinners, and running errands for the elderly.

Membership

Notable alumnae

Chapters 

A chapter is a local Theta Phi Alpha organization at a single college or university. As of August 1, 2022, Theta Phi Alpha had 55 active collegiate chapters as well as 37 alumnae associations and clubs across the United States.

Chapters are named with Greek letters in order of their date of installation, with the first chapter being the Alpha chapter. If a chapter closes for any reason, no other Theta Phi Alpha chapter is allowed to utilize its Greek name designation until a chapter can be re-chartered or re-established at the same college or university.

To become a chapter, a group begins as an emerging chapter. An emerging chapter is a group of women working together to complete the requirements to become a chapter of Theta Phi Alpha. Once established, an emerging chapter is expected to fulfill nineteen requirements or "pearls." Once these requirements are fulfilled, the emerging chapter goes through installation where its members become fully initiated into the fraternity. As of August 1, 2022, there are no emerging chapters.

Governance

National convention 

The supreme governing body of Theta Phi Alpha is the national convention which happens once every other year. The national convention is held in even-numbered years while a complementary Leadership Conference is held in odd-numbered years.

National structure 
The national office is composed of staff, the Grand Council, the board of trustees, and appointed national officers. The Grand Council is composed of seven officers who are elected at the National Convention. The Grand Council manages the affairs of the Fraternity between conventions by holding four meetings a year. The board of trustees is composed of five members who are elected at Convention for a four-year term. The National President serves as an ex-officio member. Three of the trustees must have been previous national officers. The board of trustees advises on national policy, coordinates the awards and elections program, oversees the selection of the Siena Medal recipients, and appoints the other national officers.

National presidents 
Past  national presidents of Theta Phi Alpha are:

Winifred Corcoran Adams (1919–1920)
Mildred Connely (1920–1922)
Ellen Miller (1922–1926)
Mary Elizabeth McBreen (1926–1927)
Irene Devlin (1927–1929)
Evelyn Brinks Lothes (1929–1930)
Mary A. Lyman (1930–1931)
Evelyn Brinks Lothes (1931–1935)
Anna Rose Kimpel (1935–1941)
Katherine Keliher Moran (1941–1948)
Mary Louise Weinheimer Steigerwald (1948–1954)
Lois Barry Lynch (1954–1958)
Mary R. Ammon (1958–1962)

Betty Comer McDaniel (1962–1966)
Rose McKee Everson (1966–1968)
Mary McCormick DeLamar (1968–1974)
Mary Louise Conrad Swartz (1974–1976)
Susan Stark Paddock (1976–1984)
Patricia Manelski Giallanza (1984–1988)
Theresa Primosch Kinch (1988–1992)
Katherine A. Evans (1992–1998)
Rosemary T. O'Boyle (1998–2002)
Mari Ann Callais, Ph.D. (2002–2008)
Katherine Prokupek Gaver (2008–2012)
Laura Foley (2012–2016)
Susan Grau Lee (2016-2018)

Awards 
Theta Phi Alpha has several awards available for bestowal upon members and nonmembers of the women's fraternity. These awards are given out at National Conventions.

Collegiate chapters may win the Circle of Excellence Award, an award established in 2008 to recognize outstanding collegiate chapters. Chapters must apply for this award based on campus involvement, community service, national organization contributions, and others. An outstanding alumnae association may win a Diamond Jubilee Award for excellence in membership, financial management, program planning, and other criteria. This award is a silver-loving cup crowned with the Lady of Victory.

Individuals may also win awards. The Guard of Honor is the highest award the fraternity can give to a member and recognized lifelong contributions to the fraternity. Recipients receive a guard pin with a Tudor rose in gold and a sapphire center. As of 2014, only 78 sisters have received a guard of honor pin. A complete list of honorees can be found on the Theta Phi Alpha website. Another award, the Senior Service Award, is given on Founders' Day to a collegiate senior whose scholarship, leadership, character, and service to fraternity and school have been commendable.

Siena Medal 
The Siena Medal is an award given by Theta Phi Alpha. The medal is the highest honor the organization bestows upon a non-member and is named after Saint Catherine of Siena. The past recipients of the Siena Medal are:

See also 

List of social fraternities and sororities

References 

 
1912 establishments in Michigan
National Panhellenic Conference
Fraternities and sororities in the United States
University of Michigan
Student organizations established in 1912
Women's organizations based in the United States